Managora (Manataw) is a rural locality (a selo) in Lemezinsky Selsoviet, Iglinsky District, Bashkortostan, Russia. The population was 46 as of 2010. There are 2 streets.

Geography 
Managora is located 63 km southeast of Iglino (the district's administrative centre) by road. Nizhniye Lemezy is the nearest rural locality.

References 

Rural localities in Iglinsky District